Sharmeelee is a 1971 Indian Hindi-language romantic film produced by Subodh Mukherjee and directed by Samir Ganguly. The film stars Shashi Kapoor, Raakhee, Narendra Nath, Nazir Hussain, Iftekhar, S N Banerjee, Anita Guha, Asit Sen. Raakhee played a double role in this film, and its success helped make her one of the decade's top leading ladies in Hindi films. The film also marked the debut of Ranjeet. The film starts on a romantic track, but after halfway takes a brilliant turn towards mystery and thriller genre.

Plot
While returning from the Army Base, Captain Ajit Kapoor stops over at a rest-house, where there is a party on, and he meets a charming, vivacious young lady. When he reaches home, his guardian, Father Joseph, wants him to get married. When Joseph accompanies Ajit to see the girl, whose name is Kanchan, Ajit is thrilled to find out that it is the very same girl he met at the rest-house. Ajit indicates his approval, and the stage is set for them to get married. It is then that Ajit finds out that Kanchan is not the girl he had met, but her twin-sister. Kanchan is heart-broken at this, but wants her sister to be happy. Ajit is even more happy when he finally meets Kamini, who also recognizes him.  She tries to put a spanner in the works by emotionally attacking Ajit.

Then Ajit's Army Colonel summons him for assistance in locating a female spy, who closely resembles Kanchan.

Cast
 Shashi Kapoor as Captain Ajit 
 Raakhee as Kanchan / Kamini (double role)
 Ranjeet as Kundan
 Iftekhar as Colonel
 Nazir Hussain as Father Joseph
 Narendranath as Tiger
 Jayshree T. as dancer / singer

Soundtrack
The soundtrack of Sharmeelee was an instant hit with the Indian audience, with songs composed by S. D. Burman, written by Neeraj and sung by  Kishore Kumar, Lata Mangeshkar, Asha Bhosle. The songs had featured on the Binaca Geetmala top 10 songs of 1971.

Box office
Sharmeelee was declared a "Semi-hit" by Box Office India. Sharmeelee had powerful and promising performances by the lead actors, Shashi Kapoor and Raakhee, and had received both critical as well as commercial success. It had netted approximately  2,60,00,000.

References

External links

Films scored by S. D. Burman
1971 films
1970s Hindi-language films
Twins in Indian films
Films directed by Samir Ganguly